Agonidium kedongianum is a species of ground beetle in the subfamily Platyninae. It was described by Basilewsky in 1946.

References

kedongianum
Beetles described in 1946